Semiconductor International was a trade publication and web site owned by Reed Business Information serving the information needs of manufacturers of semiconductors and integrated circuits.

The editor-in-chief was Pete Singer.
 
Established in 1978, Semiconductor International was published monthly. Regular news and feature articles covered topics including Wafer Processing, Lithography, Yield Management, Metrology, Semiconductor Packaging and Wafer Cleaning.

Semiconductor International broadcast technology webcasts each month coinciding with the print cover story for that month. In December, they broadcast an additional industry forecast webcast. Other webcasts were added to the lineup as the need arises.

As of December 2006, total BPA audited circulation was 42,500 subscribers. The issue published on April 30, 2010 was the last issue of the magazine.

References

BPA Worldwide

External links
Semiconductor International website

Business magazines published in the United States
Monthly magazines published in the United States
Defunct magazines published in the United States
Engineering magazines
Magazines established in 1978
Magazines disestablished in 2010
Magazines published in Illinois
Professional and trade magazines